Lee Robert Makel (born 11 January 1973) is an English former professional footballer who played as a midfielder.

Playing career
Makel began his career with Newcastle United as a trainee in 1991 and made 14 appearances. He moved to Blackburn Rovers for £160,000 in 1992 but only played six league matches in three years for the club. He was at the club during their Premier League winning campaign, but did not make any appearances in the league, only appearing in the UEFA Cup in Rovers' 1994–95 season.

In 1995, he moved to Huddersfield Town where he spent two-and-a-half seasons before moving to Scottish Premier Division club Heart of Midlothian for £75,000 in March 1998. He remained at Hearts until 2001, helping them win the 1998 Scottish Cup before returning to England for a brief spell with Bradford City under his former Hearts manager Jim Jefferies.

He returned to Scotland in December 2001 with Livingston, helping them to a third-place finish in their first Scottish Premier League season and a place in the UEFA Cup. He was also part of the team which won the 2004 League Cup. In 2004, Bobby Williamson signed him for Plymouth Argyle where he remained for just one season.

He again returned to Scotland in 2005 with Dunfermline Athletic before returning to Livingston in 2006.

In 2009, Makel joined East Fife and scored his first and only goal for the club in a 4–0 win over Stranraer.

Coaching career
Makel left Livingston to join Swedish Division 1 Norra side Östersund on 1 April 2008, taking up a player-coaching role with the club. A club he re-joined in June 2009 as a player/joint-coach. In January 2011, Makel signed for Scottish First Division side Cowdenbeath until the end of the season. Makel was appointed assistant manager to Colin Cameron at Cowdenbeath six months later, following the resignation of Jimmy Nicholl. As of October 2015, Makel was coaching Hibernian academy players.

Personal life
Makel was born in Sunderland and brought up in Washington, Tyne and Wear. He was a fan of Sunderland A.F.C. as a boy. His younger brother, Gavin, was a child actor appearing as Rob in BBC series Byker Grove from 1996 to 1998.

His wife Claire was caught having an affair with Chief Superintendent Gareth Blair of Police Scotland at an Edinburgh park-and-ride site in 2019.  Blair was suspended and charged alongside Claire with public indecency. He eventually quit Police Scotland.  Makel appeared in court in September 2022 for threatening text messages sent to his ex-wife when he suspected she was having an affair.

Honours
Heart of Midlothian
Scottish Cup: 1998

Livingston
Scottish League Cup: 2003–04

References

External links

Profile at londonhearts.com

1973 births
Living people
English footballers
Footballers from Sunderland
Association football midfielders
Premier League players
English Football League players
Scottish Premier League players
Scottish Football League players
Newcastle United F.C. players
Blackburn Rovers F.C. players
Huddersfield Town A.F.C. players
Heart of Midlothian F.C. players
Portsmouth F.C. players
Bradford City A.F.C. players
Livingston F.C. players
Plymouth Argyle F.C. players
Dunfermline Athletic F.C. players
East Fife F.C. players
Östersunds FK players
Cowdenbeath F.C. players
English football managers
Östersunds FK managers
Hibernian F.C. non-playing staff
English expatriate footballers
English expatriate sportspeople in Sweden
Expatriate footballers in Sweden